The .475 Wildey Magnum is a semi-automatic pistol cartridge designed for big game hunting in the Wildey pistol.

History
The .475 Wildey Magnum was designed to be a hunting round.  Cases are formed from .284 Winchester brass with the neck cut down and widened to take a .475 in bullet, and the length is the same as the .45 Winchester Magnum.  Velocity at 100 yards is equivalent to the muzzle velocity of the .44 Magnum.

Popular media
While not being very common, the .475 Wildey Magnum is most famous for its appearance in Death Wish 3, where the Wildey (chambered for this cartridge) was a signature weapon of Paul Kersey, a character portrayed by Charles Bronson (using his own personal Wildey firearm) in the Death Wish film series.

Additional Wildey calibers
In the late 1980s, Wildey, Inc. produced three additional calibers using necked down versions of the .475 Wildey Magnum brass casing originally designed in 1983 in order to achieve higher velocities and muzzle energies. First was the .357 Wildey Magnum (also known as the .357 Peterbuilt) which used a .357 Magnum bullet. Second was the .41 Wildey Magnum (also known as the 10 mm Wildey Magnum) which used a .41 Magnum bullet. Last was the .44 Wildey Magnum (also known as the 11 mm Wildey Magnum) which used a .44 Magnum bullet. All calibers were eventually discontinued.

The .45 Wildey Magnum was introduced by Wildey F.A., Inc. in 1997, which is also a necked down version of the .475 Wildey Magnum using a .45 ACP bullet. It was discontinued in 2011 when overall productions ceased.

Listed below is the ballistic performances of each produced cartridge as fired from a 10 in (254 mm) barrel. The information on the .45 Wildey Magnum is from a 12 in (305 mm) barrel. Bullet types were not provided.

See also
 List of handgun cartridges
.45 Super
.45 ACP
.44 Magnum
.45 GAP
10 mm caliber
11 mm caliber
Shooting sports
 Table of handgun and rifle cartridges

References

External links
 https://www.usafirearmscorp.com/ homepage of the manufacturer

Magnum pistol cartridges
Pistol and rifle cartridges
Wildcat cartridges